The Essex Society for Family History (abbreviated to ESFH) is a family history society, that covers the county of Essex, England.  It includes the former parts of the county, Southend-on-Sea and Thurrock, which are now unitary districts.  Parts of historic Essex now in Greater London, are covered by the East of London Family History Society and the Waltham Forest Family History Society.

ESFH was created in 1974 and is a registered Charity (290552).

The aims and objectives of ESFH are:

The advancement of the education of the general public in the study of British Family History, Genealogy, Heraldry and Local History with particular reference to Essex.
To promote the preservation, security and accessibility of archival material.

Many ESFH members have interests outside the County of Essex and the Society can offer help and support on a wide range of genealogical topics.

Until 2020, the Society held regular monthly meetings including Workshops, Tutorials & Afternoon Lecture with speakers on relevant genealogical topics.

The Society main meetings are held at the Galleywood Heritage Centre, The Common, Galleywood, Chelmsford CM2 8TR.

The Society maintains Branches based at Colchester, Harlow, Saffron Walden and Southend-on-Sea.  Monthly meetings with their own programme of Speakers were held in these locations.

Since the COVID pandemic in 2020, all meetings have bee run online. This has made them available to every member, wherever they live in the world.  As COVID restrictions are lifted, online meetings will continue, with a single consolidated programme, but with the opportunity to participate in person, at Branch venues.

The award winning ESFH web site hosts a Genealogical Database of Essex Parish Register and Memorial Inscription, Members' Surname Interests database to enable others with common interests to make contact with each, and other useful information other.

The Society also maintains its own Research Facility at the Essex Record Office (not available during the COVID pandemic).  This contains the Society Library together with several major databases, including its own Memorial Inscription Index, with Computers and Fiche Readers for access.

The Society produces its Magazine three times a year.

ESFH is a member of the Federation of Family History Societies.

External links
Essex Society for Family History
East of London Family History Society

Society for Family History, Essex
Family history societies in the United Kingdom